Paul Kee (born 8 November 1969) is a Northern Irish former footballer who played for Oxford United, Ards and Reading. During his spell at Oxford, he played 56 league games. He made 9 appearances for Northern Ireland over a four-year period.

Career
A product of East-Belfast junior football, Paul Kee was one of the brightest young goalkeepers in the Irish League, picking up Northern Ireland caps at Under-15, Under-16 and Under-18 level. Following a short Irish League career with Ards he joined Oxford United when just 18 in June 1988, making his League debut in a Division Two clash away to Middlesbrough on 25 November 1989. At 20 he made his full international debut in a friendly against Norway in March 1990. The game ended in a 3–2 defeat, and the following month he played in an Under-21 game against Israel in Coleraine.

During the 1990–91 season, Kee played in every one of Northern Ireland's games and during the 4–1 defeat by Yugoslavia in March 1991 he is reported to have gone to his gloves' bag, pulled out a white handkerchief and waved it. A month later, there followed one of the most embarrassing results in Northern Ireland's history, a 1–1 home draw with minnows the Faroe Islands.

The following season, Kee had dropped down the pecking order at Oxford, and also lost his place in the Northern Ireland squad to Tommy Wright and Alan Fettis. Over the next few seasons he made intermittent appearances for Oxford and spent several spells out on loan, including back at Ards. He made his final League appearance for Oxford at home to Portsmouth on 14 September 1993, and the following summer he returned to Ards on a permanent deal.

Early in the 1994–95 season, Northern Ireland were suffering a goalkeeping crisis, and with both Fettis and Wright injured, Kee was recalled to the squad along with Linfield's Wes Lamont. In October 1994, Kee put in an excellent performance in 2–1 victory in Austria but a month later he was responsible for at least two of the goals in a 4–0 home defeat by the Republic of Ireland. The return to fitness of Alan Fettis in 1995 finally ended any hopes Kee had of winning further caps.

Kee spent the next decade playing football for a number of clubs all over Ireland. During a season at Cobh Ramblers, he took over the goalkeeping position from Nicky Byrne, who would later go on to find worldwide fame as a member of the pop group Westlife. He spent the latter part of the 2001 season as goalkeeping coach at Bohemians Kee announced his retirement from playing at the end of the 2002–03 season, though he agreed to act as back-up 'keeper for Glentoran through the following campaign. The form and fitness of Elliott Morris meant he was never called upon.

Kee went on to join the Glentoran staff as Goalkeeping Coach. He fulfilled the same role with Bangor and Brantwood FC as an outfield player, and from August 2010 with Ards until November 2011 joining Greenwell Star FC of the Down Area Winter League in Northern Ireland as Goalkeeping Coach and has also recently signed as a player.

References

External links
Rage Online profile

1969 births
Association footballers from Northern Ireland
Northern Ireland international footballers
Northern Ireland under-21 international footballers
Association football goalkeepers
Ards F.C. players
Oxford United F.C. players
Wimbledon F.C. players
Reading F.C. players
Linfield F.C. players
Cobh Ramblers F.C. players
Carrick Rangers F.C. players
Bangor F.C. players
Crusaders F.C. players
Glentoran F.C. players
NIFL Premiership players
English Football League players
League of Ireland players
Living people